Ekaterina Vandaryeva (born January 20, 1991) is a Belarusian kickboxer who defeated future UFC champion Joanna Jędrzejczyk in a controversial judges' decision to become the WKN champion in 2011.

Career
Before participating in Muay Thai, Ekaterina Vandaryeva had been involved in volleyball, athletics, self-defense. She graduated from the school of choreography.

Ekaterina Vandaryeva began kickboxing at age 16, in 2007, with the Minsk club "Kick Fighter Gym" 
Ekaterina Vandaryeva wanted to enter the Police Academy, but later chose the Belarusian State University of Physical Training (specializing in tourism management); which she graduated in 2013

Vandaryeva first coaches were World and European champions Andrei Kulebin and Andrei Kotsur. It was they, who have made her a champion. The first professional fight Vandaryeva participated in was in Cyprus against a Greek. She became a World Champion for the first time in Thailand in 2009, a year after she had begun kickboxing.

As of the end of 2012 Ekaterina Vandaryeva has 65 fights, 58 wins, including 16 Knockouts.

Her favorite award “Best Fighter World Cup” is the award of the prestigious version – IFMA. Ekaterina Vandaryeva was awarded by the King of Thailand on his Birthday at his palace, in the presence of members of the royal family.

ONE Championship
Vandaryeva signed with ONE Championship and made her promotional debut against Janet Todd at ONE Championship: Century on October 13, 2019. She lost the fight via second-round knockout.

She made her sophomore appearance in the organization against Jackie Buntan at ONE on TNT 4 on April 28, 2021. She lost the fight via majority decision.

Vandaryeva faced Supergirl JaroonsakMuayThai at ONE: Heavy Hitters on January 14, 2022. She lost the bout via controversial split decision, but earned the Performance of the Night bonus.

The rematch between Vandaryeva and Anna "Supergirl" Jarronsak was scheduled on January 14, 2023, at ONE Fight Night 6. At the weigh-ins, Vandaryeva weighed in at 125.5 pounds, 0.5 pounds over the strawweight limit. Both bouts proceeded at catchweight with Vandaryeva each fined 20% of their purses, which went to their opponents Jarronsak. However, Jarronsak stepped in to face Stamp Fairtex in a strawweight kickboxing match and the bout was cancelled.

Vandaryeva is scheduled to face Iman Barlow on March 25, 2023, at ONE Fight Night 8.

Personal life
Vandaryeva has two children.

Championships and accomplishments

Kickboxing
World Kickboxing Network
WKN World Champion (2010, 2011)

Muay Thai
ONE Championship
$50,000 Performance of the Night (One time) 
IFMA World Championships
Gold (2009, 2010)
Silver (2010)
IFMA European Championships
IFMA European Champion (2009, 2012)
Belarus Amateur Muaythai champion (2009-2012)

Kickboxing record

|-  style="background:#;"
| 2023-03-25||  ||align=left| Iman Barlow || ONE Fight Night 8 || Kallang, Singapore || ||  ||  ||
|-  style="text-align:centr; background:#fdd;"
| 2022-01-14 || Loss ||align=left| Anna Supergirl Jarronsak || ONE: Heavy Hitters || Kallang, Singapore || Decision (Split) || 3  || 3:00 || 58–10–1
|-  style="text-align:centr; background:#fdd;"
|2021-04-28 || Loss  ||align=left| Jackie Buntan || ONE on TNT 4 ||Singapore || Decision (Majority) || 3 || 3:00 || 58–9–1
|-  style="text-align:centr; background:#fdd;"
|2019-10-13 || Loss  ||align=left| Janet Todd || ONE Championship: Century ||Tokyo, Japan || KO (Head Kick) || 2 || 2:20 || 58–8–1
|-  style="text-align:centr; background:#c5d2ea;"
|2019-5-1 || Win  ||align=left| Zeng Xiaoting ||MAS Fight Ling Shan Grand Prix ||Sichuan, China ||Draw || 1 || 9:00 || 58–7–1
|-  style="text-align:centr; background:#cfc;"
|2016-9-11 || Win  ||align=left| Ren Kailin ||Kunlun Fight 52 ||Nanjing, China ||Decision (Unanimous - Extra Round) || 4 || 3:00 || 58–7
|-  style="text-align:centr; background:#cfc;"
|2016-7-10 || Win  ||align=left| Zeng Xiaoting ||Kunlun Fight 47 ||Nanjing, China ||TKO || 3 || 3:00 || 57–7
! style=background:white colspan=9 |
|-  style="text-align:centr; background:#cfc;"
|2016-2-21 || Win  ||align=left| Laurene De Oliveira ||Kunlun Fight 38 ||Nanjing, China ||Decision (Majority) || 3 || 3:00 || 56–7
! style=background:white colspan=9 |
|-  style="text-align:centr; background:#cfc;"
|2013-12-9 || Win  ||align=left| Nuansian ||Diamond Fight - Russia vs the World ||Moscow, Russa ||TKO || 3 || 3:00 || 
! style=background:white colspan=9 |
|-  style="text-align:centr; background:#fdd;"
|2013-3-16 || Loss  ||align=left| Alena Hola ||W5 Fight Night ||Bratislava, Slovakia ||Decision (Unanimous) || 3 || 3:00 || 
! style=background:white colspan=9 |
|-  style="text-align:centr; background:#fdd;"
|2013-3-5 || Loss  ||align=left| Wang Kehan ||C3: King of Fighters ||Xichang, China ||TKO || 1 || 3:00 || 
! style=background:white colspan=9 |
|-  style="text-align:centr; background:#cfc;"
|2013-2-2 || Win  ||align=left| Ji Won Lee ||K-1 Korea MAX 2013 ||Seoul, South Korea ||Decision (Unanimous - Extra Round) || 3 || 3:00 || 
! style=background:white colspan=9 |
|-  style="text-align:centr; background:#cfc;"
|2012-12-23 || Win  ||align=left| Neslihan Mollaoglu ||W5 fighter 10||Moscow, Russa ||Decision (Majority) || 3 || 3:00 || 
! style=background:white colspan=9 |
|-  style="text-align:centr; background:#cfc;"
|2012-11-10 || Win  ||align=left| Michaela Zboncakova ||W5 fighter 7||Moscow, Russa ||Decision (Unanimous) || 3 || 3:00 || 
! style=background:white colspan=9 |
|-  style="text-align:centr; background:#cfc;"
|2011-11-26 || Win  ||align=left| Joanna Jędrzejczyk||Big-8 WKN World Grand Prix ||Minsk, Belarus ||Decision (Majority) || 5 || 3:00 || 
|-
! style=background:white colspan=9 | 
|- style="text-align:centr; background:#fdd;"
|2011-05-28 || Loss  ||align=left| Seyda Aygun Daygun||WKN Turkey||Istanbul, Turkey ||TKO || 1 || 3:00 || 
|-
|-
| colspan=9 | Legend:

References

External links

 Facebook athlete page
 Ekaterina Vandaryeva at Awakening Fighters

1991 births
Living people
People from Staryya Darohi District
Belarusian female kickboxers
Belarusian Muay Thai practitioners
Female Muay Thai practitioners
Featherweight kickboxers
Kunlun Fight kickboxers
ONE Championship kickboxers
Sportspeople from Minsk Region